Amakohia is the name of four different villages in southeastern Nigeria, all located near the city of Owerri and contained within the Ikeduru local government area.

Origin 
Amakohia is one of the towns in Ikeduru Local Government council in Imo State.

References 

Populated places in Imo State